Veneza is a settlement in the northeastern part of the island of Santiago, Cape Verde. It is part of the municipality of São Miguel. It is a suburb of the city of Calheta de São Miguel, north of the city centre. It is situated on the coast, along the Praia-Pedra Badejo-Tarrafal Road (EN1-ST02). In 2010 its population was 1,375.

References

Villages and settlements in Santiago, Cape Verde
São Miguel, Cape Verde
Populated coastal places in Cape Verde